Make Up Your Mind may refer to one of the following songs:

"Make Up Your Mind" (Theory of a Deadman song), 2003
"Make Up Your Mind" (Florence and the Machine song), 2015
"Make Up Your Mind" (Martin Garrix and Florian Picasso song), 2016
"Make Up Your Mind" (Ailee song), 2021
"Make Up Your Mind", a song by Trixie Mattel from Two Birds

See also
 Making Your Mind Up, a song by Bucks Fizz
 "Mandy Make Up Your Mind" (Arthur Johnston), a song by Arthur Johnston